Philippe Gustave Doulcet, Comte de Pontécoulant (1795–1874) was a French astronomer.

He was the younger son of Louis Gustave le Doulcet, Comte de Pontécoulant and was the brother of Louis-Adolphe Pontécoulant. After 1811 he served in the army until 1849. Following his retirement he dedicated himself to the study of mathematics and astronomy.

In 1829 he used the mathematical methods of Poisson and Lagrange to successfully predict the return of Halley's comet with good precision. His prediction of the perihelion passage was correct to within two days.

He was a member of the French Academy of Sciences. The crater Pontécoulant on the Moon is named after him.

Bibliography
 1829-1846, "Théorie Analytique du Système du Monde", Paris.
 1840, "Traité élémentaire de Physique Céleste", Paris, 2 volumes.
 1864, "Notice sur la comète de Halley et ses apparitions successives de 1531 à 1910", Comptes rendus hebdomadaires des séances de l’Académie des sciences, 58, 706-709

References

External links
 Portrait of Gustave Pontecoulant from the Lick Observatory Records Digital Archive, UC Santa Cruz Library's Digital Collections

1795 births
1874 deaths
19th-century French astronomers
Members of the French Academy of Sciences
Counts of Pontécoulant
19th-century French mathematicians
French military personnel of the Napoleonic Wars